Rishton Ka Chakravyuh  is an Indian television drama series aired on STAR Plus. The show stars 
Narayani Shastri, Sangita Ghosh, Mahima Makwana, Ankit Siwach and Ajay Chaudhary. Set against a royal backdrop, the show revolves around a mother, authoritative royal businesswoman Satrupa, and her 17-year-old free-spirited, confident daughter Anami. The show depicts the life of a royal, industrialist family that resides in Laal Mahal, the house of conspiracies. The show is loosely based on the story of Laal Mahal and depicts grey shades of relationships. The series ended on 23 February 2018.

Plot 
Seventeen-year-old Anami, abandoned at birth and adopted by a pandit family in Banaras, returns as the sole yet reluctant heir to a royal family in Laal Mahal in the Bihar badlands.

The tale begins with Satrupa bringing back Anami, whom she gave away at birth, to Laal Mahal after her son and Anami's twin brother Vatsalya's death. Reluctantly, Anami agrees to go back to Laal Mahal.

Adhiraj Pandey, the CBI officer who is handling the case of anything related to Lal Mahal, gradually develops a close bond with Anami, and the two become best friends. Slowly, Anami learns about the past of Laal Mahal and gets to know her dead brother through his diary. She decides to stay in Laal Mahal and find the true culprit behind her brother's death. Because Adhiraj is her best friend and actually loves her without knowing it, he helps her in any decision she makes without any reluctance. She also brings Sudha, her biological father's mistress and also the mother of Narottom, (Anami's half-brother) to Laal Mahal to make Narottom's life happy. She is unaware of Sudha's true motives who wants all the money, power and property of Lal Mahal.

Anami and Satrupa 
Satrupa warns Anami for Sudha, but because of Anami's stubborn behavior and misconception about Satrupa, she never trusts her. At first, Anami trusts Sudha blindfolded but gradually Adhiraj suspects Sudha and tells Anami to watch out for her. Anami tries running away from Lal Mahal to live with her foster parents when her brother Laddo, who is the son of her foster parents, was kidnapped by Sudha's brother and her maternal uncle Purushottam. Adhiraj plans to go with her citing her safety, in order to spend more time with Anami. Neither Adhiraj or Anami wants to leave each other but Anami cannot stay in Lal Mahal. When Anami and Adhiraj, along with Laddo reach Anami's foster parents, they spend a night in one of her dad's friend's houses. Sudha gets the house on fire through people whom she had hired to work for her. Anami thinks it was Satrupa's plan and decides to return to seek revenge.

Adhiraj and Anami 
Meanwhile, Adhiraj expresses his feelings for Anami. Anami seeks some time for her to discover her feelings for him. She gets to know Sudha's true motives when Adhiraj gets proof against her, which causes her to be imprisoned. Narottam provides the proof through a self-confessed audio recording. Anami knows that Satrupa is not guilty. In the end, Sudha is exposed and Anami asks Satrupa for forgiveness. Both share a huge hug and the whole family is happy. Baldev and Satrupa reunite. When Narottam was about to leave Laal Mahal, Anami asks the reason and he tells that because his mother and maternal uncle were involved in Vatsalya's accident, he has no right to stay with the family. Anami promises to keep the secret and asks him not to leave. Terms are settled between Baldev-Satrupa and Narottam. Anami tells Adhiraj about the accident and he makes Sudha confess her crimes. Adiraj and Anami bring Madhu and Murari Pathak to Laal Mahal. Satrupa requests them to stay with them at Laal Mahal.

Seeing the closeness between Anami and Adhiraj Dhiru, Pandey (Adhiraj's father) gets Adhiraj transferred. Learning this, Baldev, along with Gayatri (his mother) meets Pandey and asks for forgiveness for all their deeds and offers friendship. Baldev accepts Narottam and he agrees to stay. Gayatri invites the Pandey family for dinner and everyone shares a happy time until they come to a huge shock. Vatsalya comes into Lal Mahal calling Satrupa (Maa). Everyone is shocked including Anami. The series ends on a cliffhanger with Anami and Vatsalya's face.

Episodes

Cast

Main cast 
 Narayani Shastri as Satrupa Baldev Singh, Baldev's wife, and Anami and Vaatsalya's mother 
 Sangita Ghosh as Sudha, Baldev's former lover & Narottam's Mother
 Mahima Makwana as Anami Baldev Singh, Baldev-Satrupa's estranged daughter, Vaatsalya's sister
Ankit Siwach as CBI officer Adhiraj Pandey

Recurring cast
 Anju Mahendru as Gayatri Singh, Baldev's mother, Pujan's Aunt & Anami's grandmother
 Ram Gopal Bajaj as Vikramaditya Singh Anami and vatsalya grandfather, Head of Lal Mahal and Royal Steel, Gayatri's husband & Baldev's father
 Ajay Chaudhary as Baldev Vikram Singh, Satrupa's husband, Anami, Vaatsalya and Narottam's father & Pujan's cousin
 Payal Nair/Vibhuti Thakur as Daamo, Satrupa's assistant and confidant (2017)(2018)
 Bhupinder Singh as Dhirendra Pandey (Dhiru), Adhiraj and Tanya's father
 Akash Gill as Narottam, Baldev's illegitimate son
 Praneet Bhat as Pujan Singh, Baldev's cousin
 Karishma Kapur as Kamini, Pujan's wife 
 Ieshaan Sehgal as Avdhoot Pratap Singh, Pujan-Kamini's son
 Vaishnavi Rao as Tanya Pandey, Adhiraj's Sister
 Tom Alter as Somdev Guruji
 Mohit Chauhan as Pandit Murari Pathak, Anami's foster father
 Lubna Salim as Madhu Pathak, Anami's foster mother
 Vineet Kumar Chaudhary as Purushottam, Sudha's Brother
 Devyansh Tapuria as Lakshya "Ladoo" Pathak, Anami's foster brother
 Sanyukta Timsina as Ila, Adhiraj's assistant at CBI office
 Shristhi Mitra as Poonam, Anami's assistant
 Devarshi Shah as Vatsalya Baldev Singh, Baldev-Satrupa's son, Anami's biological twin brother

Production

Development and premiere

On 3 August 2016 an article published stating Mahima Makwana and Narayani Shastri being part of the show. On 17 July 2017 the first promo of the show was released on Mahima's Instagram. After that, a series of promos featuring Anami was released with #AnamiEkTsunami on Star Plus web pages. The show produced by Bhupinder Singh and Sanjot Kaur under the banner of Rolling Pictures is a Political, Family Drama loosely based on the story of Mahabharat and depicts grey shades of relationships. The show premiered at 6:00 p.m.(IST) on Monday 7  August 2017 and airs from Monday to Friday. Later on, the show shifted to 8:00 pm.(IST) prime time.

Casting

Actresses, Mahima Makwana and Narayani Shastri were chosen to play the role of Anami and Satrupa respectively. Talking about her character Narayani said, "Satarupa is a sophisticated royal woman. She is a strong woman with a mind of her own and I am enjoying playing the same". Mahima, who has to wear a wig of Dreadlocks in the show said, "Which female actress on TV has adorned jattas? It a herculean task to move around and do action scenes with this heavy wig. I always like trying out different things, so it's fun and people are also giving me a positive feedback". Actress, Sangita Ghosh of ' Kehta Hai Dil Jee Le Zara fame, was cast to play Sudha. Newcomer Ankit Siwach landed in role opposite Mahima Makwana. Actor Akash Gill was chosen to play effeminate Character. Initially, Seema Pahwa was cast as Anami's mother. The role ultimately went to Lubna Salim. Actor Benjamin Gilani was earlier cast as Vikramaditya Singh but was replaced by Ram Gopal Bajaj before the release. The other Prominent casts include Ajay Chaudhary, Lubna Salim, Anju Mahendru, Devrshi Shah, Praneet Bhat among others.

Adaptations
In Africa, The show is dubbed in English as Family Secrets and aired on Star Life.

Awards and nominations

Soundtracks

Series Soundtrack

Satrupa Vatsalya track

Note: small track between mother and son, in episode 6.

Anami and Madhu Pathak track

Note: Small track daughter thinking about her foster mother, in episode 23.

Adhiraj and anami track

References

External links
 Rishton Ka Chakravyuh On Hotstar
 

2017 Indian television series debuts
Hindi-language television shows
StarPlus original programming
Indian television soap operas
Indian drama television series
Television shows set in Uttar Pradesh
Television shows set in Bihar
2018 Indian television series endings